The 2012 New York Yankees season was the 110th season for the New York Yankees franchise. The Yankees began the season in St. Petersburg, Florida against the Tampa Bay Rays on April 6. They finished the season 95–67, 1st place in the AL East. They began their post-season run by beating the Baltimore Orioles in five games in the Division Series. They advanced to play the Detroit Tigers in the American League Championship Series, but were swept in four games by the Tigers following a season-ending injury to shortstop and team captain Derek Jeter.

This was the Yankees 20th consecutive winning season, dating back to 1993.

Personnel moves 

On October 31, 2011, the New York Yankees agreed to a contract extension with (LHP) CC Sabathia for 5 years, worth $122M guaranteed. There is also a vesting option for a 6th year that could push the total contract value to $142M. 
On December 9, 2011, the New York Yankees signed (RHP) Freddy Garcia to a one-year contract worth $4M, plus incentives. 
On December 30, 2011, the New York Yankees signed (DH) Andruw Jones to a one-year contract worth $2M, with an extra $1.4M in potential incentives. 
On January 23, the New York Yankees acquired (RHP) Michael Pineda and minor league prospect (RHP) Jose Campos in exchange for top prospect (C) Jesús Montero and (RHP) Hector Noesi. 
On January 24, the Yankees held a press conference officially announcing the retirement of longtime Yankees catcher Jorge Posada. 
On January 26, the New York Yankees signed (RHP) Hiroki Kuroda to a one-year contract worth $10M. 
On February 19, the New York Yankees traded (RHP) A. J. Burnett to the Pirates for $13M cash, minor league pitcher Diego Moreno and minor league outfielder Excardo Ciones. 
On February 21, the New York Yankees signed (DH) Raúl Ibañez to a one-year contract worth $1.1M, with plate appearance incentives bringing the potential value up to a maximum of $4M. 
On February 22, the New York Yankees signed (RHP) David Aardsma to a one-year contract worth $500k, plus another $500k in incentives. The deal also included a club option for 2013 worth $500k. 
On February 27, the New York Yankees signed (INF) Eric Chavez to a one-year contract worth $900k, plus incentives. 
On March 16, the New York Yankees signed (LHP) Andy Pettitte to a one-year Minor League contract, worth $2.5 million. 
July 2012: Yankees acquired Ichiro Suzuki in a trade for two minor league pitchers.
On August 12, 2012 the New York Yankees signed a contract with (RHP) Derek Lowe

Roster

Starters by position

Note: Pos = Position

Regular season

Season standings

American League East

American League Wild Card

Record vs. opponents

April

On April 13 the Yankees won their home opener against the Los Angeles Angels of Anaheim for the 14th time in the last 15 seasons.

On April 20, against their arch-rival Boston Red Sox during the 100th Anniversary of Fenway Park, Alex Rodriguez hit his 631st career home-run, passing former teammate Ken Griffey Jr. for sole possession of 5th on the all-time list.

July
On July 23, the Yankees agreed to a trade that acquired Ichiro Suzuki from the Seattle Mariners for D. J. Mitchell and Danny Farquhar.
On July 27 the Yankees won their 60th game, the first team in the season to do so.

October
On October 3, during the last game of the season, the Yankees clinched their 18th American League East title when the Baltimore Orioles lost to the Tampa Bay Rays 4–1.  The Yankees went on to win their game against the Boston Red Sox, 14–2, giving them the best record in the American League, and home-field advantage for the American League playoffs.

Game log

|- align="center" bgcolor="ffbbbb"
| 1 || April 6 || @ Rays || 6–7 || Rodney (1–0) || Rivera (0–1) || || 34,078 || 0–1 || L1
|- align="center" bgcolor="ffbbbb"
| 2 || April 7 || @ Rays || 6–8 || Price (1–0) || Kuroda (0–1) || Rodney (1) || 34,078 || 0–2 || L2
|- align="center" bgcolor="ffbbbb"
| 3 || April 8 || @ Rays || 0–3 || Hellickson (1–0) || Hughes (0–1) || Rodney (2) || 30,413 || 0–3 || L3
|- align="center" bgcolor="bbffbb"
| 4 || April 9 || @ Orioles || 6–2 || Nova (1–0) || Matusz (0–1) || || 25,478 || 1–3 || W1
|- align="center" bgcolor="bbffbb"
| 5 || April 10 || @ Orioles || 5–4 (12) || Rapada (1–0) || Strop (0–1) || Rivera (1) || 24,659 || 2–3 || W2
|- align="center" bgcolor="bbffbb"
| 6 || April 11 || @ Orioles || 6–4 (10) || Soriano (1–0) || Gregg (0–1) || Rivera (2) || 22,919 || 3–3 || W3
|- align="center" bgcolor="bbffbb"
| 7 || April 13 ||  Angels || 5–0 || Kuroda (1–1) || Santana (0–2) || || 49,386 || 4–3 || W4
|- align="center" bgcolor="ffbbbb"
| 8 || April 14 || Angels || 1–7 || Wilson (2–0) || Hughes (0–2) || || 46,829 || 4–4 || L1
|- align="center" bgcolor="bbffbb"
| 9 || April 15 || Angels || 11–5 || Nova (2–0) || Williams (0–1) || || 41,055 || 5–4 || W1
|- align="center" bgcolor="ffbbbb"
| 10 || April 16 || Twins || 3–7 || Pavano (1–1) || García (0–1) || || 40,218 || 5–5 || L1
|- align="center" bgcolor="bbffbb"
| 11 || April 17 || Twins || 8–3 || Sabathia (1–0) || Liriano (0–2) || || 40,194 || 6–5 || W1
|- align="center" bgcolor="ffbbbb"
| 12 || April 18 || Twins || 5–6 || Marquis (1–0) || Kuroda (1–2) || Capps (3) || 36,831 || 6–6 || L1 
|- align="center" bgcolor="bbffbb"
| 13 || April 19 || Twins || 7–6 || Hughes (1–2) || Swarzak (0–3) || Rivera (3) || 40,327 || 7–6 || W1
|- align="center" bgcolor="bbffbb"
| 14 || April 20 || @ Red Sox || 6–2 || Nova (3–0) || Buchholz (1–1) || || 36,770 || 8–6 || W2
|- align="center" bgcolor="bbffbb"
| 15 || April 21 || @ Red Sox || 15–9 || Soriano (2–0) || Aceves (0–1) || || 37,839  || 9–6 || W3
|- align="center" bgcolor="bbbbbb"
|—|| April 22 || @ Red Sox ||colspan=7|Game Postponed (rain) (rescheduled July 7)
|- align="center" bgcolor="bbffbb"
| 16 || April 23 || @ Rangers || 7–4 || Sabathia (2–0) || Holland (2–1) || Rivera (4) || 48,234 || 10–6 || W4
|- align="center" bgcolor="ffbbbb"
| 17 || April 24 || @ Rangers || 0–2 || Darvish (3–0) || Kuroda (1–3) || Nathan (5)|| 47,085 || 10–7 || L1
|- align="center" bgcolor="ffbbbb"
| 18 || April 25 || @ Rangers || 3–7 || Ross (4–0) || Hughes (1–3) || || 47,942 || 10–8 || L2
|- align="center" bgcolor="bbffbb"
| 19 || April 27 || Tigers || 7–6 || Rivera (1–1) || Villarreal (0–1) || || 41,200 || 11–8 || W1
|- align="center" bgcolor="ffbbbb"
| 20 || April 28 || Tigers || 5–7 || Smyly (1–0) || García (0–2) || || 44,686 || 11–9 || L1
|- align="center" bgcolor="bbffbb"
| 21 || April 29 || Tigers || 6–2 || Sabathia (3–0) || Scherzer (1–3) || || 43,084 || 12–9 || W1
|- align="center" bgcolor="bbffbb"
| 22 || April 30 || Orioles || 2–1 || Kuroda (2–3) || Hammel (3–1) || Rivera (5) || 36,890 || 13–9 || W2
|-

|- align="center" bgcolor="ffbbbb"
| 23 || May 1 || Orioles || 1−7 || Matusz (1−3) || Hughes (1–4) || || 37,790 || 13–10 || L1
|- align="center" bgcolor="ffbbbb"
| 24 || May 2 || Orioles || 0−5 || Arrieta (2−2) || Nova (3–1) || || 39,360 || 13–11 || L2
|- align="center" bgcolor="ffbbbb"
| 25 || May 3 || @ Royals || 3−4 || Duffy (2−2) || Phelps (0−1) || Broxton (5) || 19,590 || 13−12 || L3
|- align="center" bgcolor="bbffbb"
| 26 || May 4 || @ Royals || 6−2 || Sabathia (4–0) || Chen (0−4) || || 24,153 || 14−12 || W1
|- align="center" bgcolor="ffbbbb"
| 27 || May 5 || @ Royals || 1−5 || Paulino (1–0) || Kuroda (2–4) || || 29,121 || 14−13 || L1
|- align="center" bgcolor="bbffbb"
| 28 || May 6 || @ Royals || 10−4 || Hughes (2–4) || Hochevar (2−3) || || 20,434 || 15−13 || W1 
|- align="center" bgcolor="bbffbb"
| 29 || May 8 || Rays || 5−3 || Nova (4–1) || Shields (5–1) || Robertson (1) || 37,086 || 16−13 || W2
|- align="center" bgcolor="ffbbbb"
| 30 || May 9 || Rays || 1−4 || Rodney (2–0) || Robertson (0–1) || || 38,024 || 16−14 || L1
|- align="center" bgcolor="bbffbb"
| 31 || May 10 || Rays || 5−3 || Sabathia (5–0) || Price (5–2) || Soriano (1) || 37,720 || 17−14 || W1
|- align="center" bgcolor="bbffbb"
| 32 || May 11 || Mariners || 6–2 || Kuroda (3–4) || Hernández (3–2) || || 37,226 || 18−14 || W2
|- align="center" bgcolor="bbffbb"
| 33 || May 12 || Mariners || 6–2 || Hughes (3–4) || Noesí (2–4) || Logan (1) || 43,954 || 19–14 || W3
|- align="center" bgcolor="ffbbbb"
| 34 || May 13 || Mariners || 2–6 || Millwood (1–4) || Pettitte (0–1) || || 41,631 || 19–15 || L1
|- align="center" bgcolor="bbffbb"
| 35 || May 14 || @ Orioles || 8–5 || Phelps (1−1) || Ayala (1−1) || Soriano (2) || 16,492 || 20–15 || W1
|- align="center" bgcolor="ffbbbb"
| 36 || May 15 || @ Orioles || 2–5 || Chen (4–0) || Sabathia (5–1) || Johnson (12) || 24,055 || 20–16 || L1
|- align="center" bgcolor="ffbbbb"
| 37 || May 16 || @ Blue Jays || 1–8 || Drabek (3–4) || Kuroda (3–5) || || 28,915 || 20–17 || L2
|- align="center" bgcolor="ffbbbb"
| 38 || May 17 || @ Blue Jays || 1–4 || Hutchison (3–1) || Hughes (3–5) || Janssen (3) || 31,266 || 20–18 || L3
|- align="center" bgcolor="bbffbb"
| 39 || May 18 || Reds || 4–0 || Pettitte (1–1) || Arroyo (2–2) || || 42,015 || 21–18 || W1
|- align="center" bgcolor="ffbbbb"
| 40 || May 19 || Reds || 5–6 || Bailey (2–3) || Nova (4–2) || Arredondo (1) || 45,302 || 21–19 || L1
|- align="center" bgcolor="ffbbbb"
| 41 || May 20 || Reds || 2–5 || Cueto (5–1) || Sabathia (5–2) || Chapman (1) || 45,622 || 21–20 || L2
|- align="center" bgcolor="ffbbbb"
| 42 || May 21 || Royals || 0–6 || Paulino (2–1) || Kuroda (3–6) ||  || 39,229 || 21–21 || L3
|- align="center" bgcolor="bbffbb"
| 43 || May 22 || Royals || 3–2 || Hughes (4–5) || Hochevar (3−5) || Soriano (3) || 37,674 || 22–21 || W1
|- align="center" bgcolor="bbffbb"
| 44 || May 23 || Royals || 8–3 || Pettitte (2–1) || Smith (0–1) || || 40,407 || 23–21 || W2
|- align="center" bgcolor="bbffbb"
| 45 || May 25 || @ Athletics || 6–3 || Nova (5–2) || Ross (2–5) || Soriano (4) || 33,559 || 24–21 || W3
|- align="center" bgcolor="bbffbb"
| 46 || May 26 || @ Athletics || 9–2 || Sabathia (6–2) || Colón (4–5) || || 27,112 || 25–21 || W4
|- align="center" bgcolor="bbffbb"
| 47 || May 27 || @ Athletics || 2–0 || Kuroda (4–6) || Milone (6–4)  || Soriano (5) || 25,078 || 26–21 || W5
|- align="center" bgcolor="ffbbbb"
| 48 || May 28 || @ Angels || 8–9 || Walden (2–1) || Wade (0–1) || || 44,016 || 26–22 || L1
|- align="center" bgcolor="ffbbbb"
| 49 || May 29 || @ Angels || 1–5 || Haren (3–5) || Pettitte (2–2) || || 42,065 || 26–23 || L2
|- align="center" bgcolor="bbffbb"
| 50 || May 30 || @ Angels || 6–5 || Nova (6–2) || Takahashi (0–2) || Soriano (6) || 40,111 || 27–23 || W1
|-

|- align="center" bgcolor="bbffbb"
| 51 || June 1 || @ Tigers || 9–4 || Sabathia (7–2) || Crosby (0–1) || Soriano (7) || 41,831 || 28–23 || W2
|- align="center" bgcolor="ffbbbb"
| 52 || June 2 || @ Tigers || 3–4 || Valverde (3–1) || Phelps (1−2) || || 44,593 || 28–24 || L1
|- align="center" bgcolor="bbffbb"
| 53 || June 3 || @ Tigers || 5–1 || Hughes (5–5) || Verlander (5–4) || || 42,419 || 29–24 || W1
|- align="center" bgcolor="bbffbb"
| 54 || June 5 || Rays || 7–0 || Pettitte (3–2) || Shields (6–4) || || 40,537 || 30–24 || W2
|- align="center" bgcolor="bbffbb"
| 55 || June 6 || Rays || 4–1 || Nova (7–2) || Cobb (2–2) || Soriano (8) || 38,370 || 31–24 || W3
|- align="center" bgcolor="ffbbbb"
| 56 || June 7 || Rays || 3–7 || Price (8–3) || Sabathia (7–3) || || 39,891 || 31–25 || L1
|- align="center" bgcolor="bbffbb"
| 57 || June 8 || Mets || 9–1 || Kuroda (5–6) || Santana (3–3) || || 48,566 || 32–25 || W1
|- align="center" bgcolor="bbffbb"
| 58 || June 9 || Mets || 4–2 || Hughes (6–5) || Gee (4–4) || Soriano (9) || 48,575 || 33–25 || W2
|- align="center" bgcolor="bbffbb"
| 59 || June 10 || Mets || 5–4 || Logan (1–0) || Rauch (3–6) || || 49,010 || 34–25 || W3
|- align="center" bgcolor="bbffbb"
| 60 || June 11 || @ Braves || 3–0 || Nova (8–2) || Delgado (4–6) || || 42,669 || 35–25 || W4
|- align="center" bgcolor="bbffbb"
| 61 || June 12 || @ Braves || 6–4 || Sabathia (8–3) || Venters (3–3) || Soriano (10) || 41,452 || 36–25 || W5
|- align="center" bgcolor="bbffbb"
| 62 || June 13 || @ Braves || 3–2 || Kuroda (6–6) || Hudson (4–3) || Soriano (11) || 48,938 || 37–25 || W6
|- align="center" bgcolor="bbffbb"
| 63 || June 15 || @ Nationals || 7–2 || Hughes (7–5) || Gonzalez (8–3) || || 41,406 || 38–25 || W7
|- align="center" bgcolor="bbffbb"
| 64 || June 16 || @ Nationals || 5–3 (14) || García (1–2) || Lidge (0–1) || Soriano (12) || 41,287 || 39–25 || W8
|- align="center" bgcolor="bbffbb"
| 65 || June 17 || @ Nationals || 4–1 || Nova (9–2) || Jackson (3–4) || Soriano (13) || 41,442 || 40–25 || W9
|- align="center" bgcolor="bbffbb"
| 66 || June 18 || Braves || 6–2 || Sabathia (9–3) || Minor (3–5) || || 42,709 || 41–25 || W10
|- align="center" bgcolor="ffbbbb"
| 67 || June 19 || Braves || 3–4 || Hudson (5–3) || Kuroda (6–7) || Kimbrel (20) || 41,219 || 41–26 || L1
|- align="center" bgcolor="ffbbbb"
| 68 || June 20 || Braves || 5–10 || Hanson (8–4) || Hughes (7–6) || || 45,094 || 41–27 || L2
|- align="center" bgcolor="ffbbbb"
| 69 || June 22 || @ Mets || 4–6 || Niese (5–3) || Pettitte (3–3) || Francisco (18) || 40,191 || 41–28 || L3
|- align="center" bgcolor="bbffbb"
| 70 || June 23 || @ Mets || 4–3 || Rapada (2–0) || Rauch (3–7) || Soriano (14) || 42,122 || 42–28 || W1
|- align="center" bgcolor="bbffbb"
| 71 || June 24 || @ Mets || 6–5 || Logan (2–0) || Batista (1–2) || Soriano (15) || 42,364 || 43–28 || W2
|- align="center" bgcolor="bbffbb"
| 72 || June 25 || Indians || 7–1 || Kuroda (7–7) || Tomlin (3–5) || || 42,290 || 44–28 || W3
|- align="center" bgcolor="bbffbb"
| 73 || June 26 || Indians || 6–4 || Hughes (8–6) || Masterson (4–7) || Soriano (16) || 43,006 || 45–28 || W4
|- align="center" bgcolor="bbffbb"
| 74 || June 27 || Indians || 5–4 || García (2–2) || Jiménez (7–6) || Soriano (17) || 45,099 || 46–28 || W5
|- align="center" bgcolor="ffbbbb"
| 75 || June 28 || White Sox || 3–4 || Santiago (2–1) || Robertson (0–2) || Reed (11) || 44,041 || 46–29 || L1
|- align="center" bgcolor="ffbbbb"
| 76 || June 29 || White Sox || 7–14 || Quintana (3–1) || Phelps (1−3) || || 44,265 || 46–30 || L2
|- align="center" bgcolor="bbffbb"
| 77 || June 30 || White Sox || 4–0 || Kuroda (8–7) || Peavy (6–5) || || 46,895 || 47–30 || W1
|-

|- align="center" bgcolor="bbffbb"
| 78 || July 1 || White Sox || 4–2 || Hughes (9–6) || Floyd (6–8) || Soriano (18) || 48,324 || 48–30 || W2
|- align="center" bgcolor="ffbbbb"
| 79 || July 2 || @ Rays || 3–4 || Moore (5–5) || Robertson (0–3) || Rodney (23) || 21,742 || 48–31 || L1
|- align="center" bgcolor="ffbbbb"
| 80 || July 3 || @ Rays || 4–7 || Shields (8–5) || Nova (9–3) || Rodney (24) || 26,453 || 48–32 || L2
|- align="center" bgcolor="bbffbb"
| 81 || July 4 || @ Rays || 4–3 || Logan (3–0) || Farnsworth (0–1) || Soriano (19) || 28,033 || 49–32 || W1
|- align="center" bgcolor="bbffbb"
| 82 || July 6 || @ Red Sox || 10–8 || Logan (4–0) || Miller (2–1) || Soriano (20) || 38,066 || 50–32 || W2
|- align="center" bgcolor="bbffbb"
| 83 || July 7 || @ Red Sox || 6–1 || García (3–2) || Morales (1–2) || || 38,170 || 51–32 || W3
|- align="center" bgcolor="ffbbbb"
| 84 || July 7 || @ Red Sox || 5–9 || Doubront (9–4) || Hughes (9–7) || || 37,791 || 51–33 || L1
|- align="center" bgcolor="bbffbb"
| 85 || July 8 || @ Red Sox || 7–3 || Nova (10–3) || Lester (5–6) || || 38,270 || 52–33 || W1
|- style="text-align:center;"
|colspan="10" style="background:#bbcaff;"|All-Star Break: NL defeats AL 8–0
|- align="center" bgcolor="bbffbb"
| 86 || July 13 || Angels || 6–5 || Qualls (2–1) || Downs (1–1) || Soriano (21) || 47,873 || 53–33 || W2
|- align="center" bgcolor="bbffbb"
| 87 || July 14 || Angels || 5–3 || García (4–2) || Williams (6–6) || Soriano (22) || 47,789 || 54–33 || W3
|- align="center" bgcolor="ffbbbb"
| 88 || July 15 || Angels || 8–10 || Weaver (11–1) || Nova (10–4) || Jepsen (1) || 46,679 || 54–34 || L1
|- align="center" bgcolor="bbffbb"
| 89 || July 16 || Blue Jays || 6–3 || Robertson (1–3) || Loup (0–1) ||  || 42,819 || 55–34 || W1
|- align="center" bgcolor="bbffbb"
| 90 || July 17 || Blue Jays || 6–1 || Sabathia (10–3) || Cecil (2–2) || Soriano (24) || 44,975 || 56–34 || W2
|- align="center" bgcolor="bbffbb"
| 91 || July 18 || Blue Jays || 6–0 (7) || Kuroda (9–7) || Romero (8–6) || || 45,986 || 57–34 || W3
|- align="center" bgcolor="ffbbbb"
| 92 || July 19 || @ Athletics || 3–4 || Griffin (2–0) || García (4–3) || Cook (10) || 23,382 || 57–35 || L1
|- align="center" bgcolor="ffbbbb"
| 93 || July 20 || @ Athletics || 2–3 || Cook (4–2) || Eppley (0–1) || || 24,148 || 57–36 || L2
|- align="center" bgcolor="ffbbbb"
| 94 || July 21 || @ Athletics || 1–2 || Parker (7–4) || Hughes (9–8) || Doolittle (1) || 28,142 || 57–37 || L3
|- align="center" bgcolor="ffbbbb"
| 95 || July 22 || @ Athletics || 4–5 (12) || Blevins (3–0) || Eppley (0–2) || || 30,470 || 57–38 || L4
|- align="center" bgcolor="bbffbb"
| 96 || July 23 || @ Mariners || 4–1 || Kuroda (10–7) || Millwood (3–8) || Soriano (25) || 29,911 || 58–38 || W1
|- align="center" bgcolor="ffbbbb"
| 97 || July 24 || @ Mariners || 2–4 || Hernández (9–5) || García (4–4) || Wilhelmsen (11) || 31,908 || 58–39 || L1
|- align="center" bgcolor="bbffbb"
| 98 || July 25 || @ Mariners || 5–2  || Phelps (2–3) || Luetge (1–1) || Soriano (26) || 36,071 || 59–39  || W1
|- align="center" bgcolor="bbffbb"
| 99 || July 27 || Red Sox || 10–3 || Hughes (10–8) || Cook (2–4) || || 49,571 || 60–39 || W2
|- align="center" bgcolor="ffbbbb"
| 100 || July 28 || Red Sox || 6–8 || Miller (3–1) || Soriano (2–1) || Aceves (22) || 49,573 || 60–40 || L1
|- align="center" bgcolor="ffbbbb"
| 101 || July 29 || Red Sox || 2–3 (10) || Aceves (2–6) || Robertson (1–4) || || 48,526 || 60–41 || L2
|- align="center" bgcolor="ffbbbb"
| 102 || July 30 || Orioles || 4–5 || González (3–2) || García (4–5) || Johnson (31) || 43,052 || 60–42 || L3
|- align="center" bgcolor="ffbbbb"
| 103 || July 31 || Orioles || 5–11 || Tillman (4–1) || Nova (10–5) || || 42,821 || 60–43 || L4
|-

|- align="center" bgcolor="bbffbb"
| 104 || August 1 || Orioles || 12–3 || Hughes (11–8) || Britton (1–1) || || 44,593 || 61–43 || W1
|- align="center" bgcolor="bbffbb"
| 105 || August 3 || Mariners || 6–3 || Sabathia (11–3) || Millwood (4–9) || || 45,872 || 62–43 || W2
|- align="center" bgcolor="ffbbbb"
| 106 || August 4 || Mariners || 0–1 || Hernández (10–5) || Kuroda (10–8) || || 47,067 || 62–44 || L1
|- align="center" bgcolor="bbffbb"
| 107 || August 5 || Mariners || 6–2 || García (5–5) || Iwakuma (2–3) || || 45,878 || 63–44 || W1
|- align="center" bgcolor="ffbbbb"
| 108 || August 6 || @ Tigers || 2–7 || Verlander (12–7) || Nova (10–6) || || 41,381 || 63–45 || L1
|- align="center" bgcolor="ffbbbb"
| 109 || August 7 || @ Tigers || 5–6 || Porcello (9–6) || Hughes (11–9) || Valverde (22) || 39,760 || 63–46 || L2
|- align="center" bgcolor="bbffbb"
| 110 || August 8 || @ Tigers || 12–8 || Sabathia (12–3) || Sánchez (6–9) || ||  41,879 || 64–46 || W1
|- align="center" bgcolor="bbffbb"
| 111 || August 9 || @ Tigers || 4–3 || Rapada (3–0) || Benoit (1–3) || Soriano (27) || 40,940 || 65–46 || W2
|- align="center" bgcolor="bbffbb"
| 112 || August 10 || @ Blue Jays || 10–4 || García (6–5) || Romero (8–9) || || 41,610 || 66–46 || W3
|- align="center" bgcolor="bbffbb"
| 113 || August 11 || @ Blue Jays || 5–2 || Nova (11–6) || Laffey (3–3) || Soriano (28) || 45,582 || 67–46 || W4
|- align="center" bgcolor="ffbbbb"
| 114 || August 12 || @ Blue Jays || 7–10 || Happ (8–10) || Hughes (11–10) || Janssen (15) || 43,924 || 67–47 || L1
|- align="center" bgcolor="bbffbb"
| 115 || August 13 || Rangers || 8–2 || Phelps (3–3) || Dempster (6–6) || Lowe (1) || 45,676 || 68–47 || W1
|- align="center" bgcolor="bbffbb"
| 116 || August 14 || Rangers || 3–0 || Kuroda (11–8) || Harrison (13–7) || || 44,533 || 69–47 || W2
|- align="center" bgcolor="bbffbb"
| 117 || August 15 || Rangers || 3–2 || García (7–5) || Feldman (6–8) || Soriano (29) || 45,921 || 70–47 || W3
|- align="center" bgcolor="ffbbbb"
| 118 || August 16 || Rangers || 6–10 || Scheppers (1–0) || Logan (4–1) || || 47,645 || 70–48 || L1
|- align="center" bgcolor="bbffbb"
| 119 || August 17 || Red Sox || 6–4 || Hughes (12–10) || Morales (3–4) || Soriano (30) || 49,422 || 71–48 || W1
|- align="center" bgcolor="ffbbbb"
| 120 || August 18 || Red Sox || 1–4 || Lester (7–10) || Phelps (3–4) || Aceves (25) || 49,466 || 71–49 || L1
|- align="center" bgcolor="bbffbb"
| 121 || August 19 || Red Sox || 4–1 || Kuroda (12–8) || Beckett (5–11) || Soriano (31) || 48,620 || 72–49 || W1
|- align="center" bgcolor="ffbbbb"
| 122 || August 20 || @ White Sox || 6–9 || Myers (2–5) || Logan (4–2) || Reed (22) || 27,561 || 72–50 || L1
|- align="center" bgcolor="ffbbbb"
| 123 || August 21 || @ White Sox || 3–7 || Liriano (5–10) || Nova (11–7) || || 24,247 || 72–51 || L2
|- align="center" bgcolor="ffbbbb"
| 124 || August 22 || @ White Sox || 1–2 || Sale (15–4) || Hughes (12–11) || Reed (23) || 26,319 || 72–52 || L3
|- align="center" bgcolor="bbffbb"
| 125 || August 24 || @ Indians || 3–1 || Sabathia (13–3) || Allen (0–1) || Soriano (32) || 27,986 || 73–52 || W1
|- align="center" bgcolor="ffbbbb"
| 126 || August 25 || @ Indians || 1–3 || Masterson (10–11) || Kuroda (12–9) || Perez (33) || 34,374 || 73–53 || L1
|- align="center" bgcolor="bbffbb"
| 127 || August 26 || @ Indians || 4–2 || Logan (5–2) || Jiménez (9–13) || Soriano (33) || 26,166 || 74–53 || W1
|- align="center" bgcolor="ffbbbb"
| 128 || August 27 || Blue Jays || 7–8 (11) || Oliver (3–2) || Lowe (8–11) || || 42,962 || 74–54 || L1
|- align="center" bgcolor="bbffbb"
| 129 || August 28 || Blue Jays || 2–1 || Hughes (13–11) || Romero (8–12) || Soriano (34) || 42,472 || 75–54 || W1
|- align="center" bgcolor="ffbbbb"
| 130 || August 29 || Blue Jays || 5–8 || Happ (10–10) || Sabathia (13–4) || Janssen (17) || 46,010 || 75–55 || L1
|- align="center" bgcolor="ffbbbb"
| 131 || August 31 || Orioles || 1–6 || González (6–3) || Kuroda (12–10) || || 43,352 || 75–56 || L2
|-

|- align="center" bgcolor="bbffbb"
| 132 || September 1 || Orioles || 4–3 || Logan (6–2) || Chen (12–8) || Soriano (35) || 46,122 || 76–56 || W1
|- align="center" bgcolor="ffbbbb"
| 133 || September 2 || Orioles || 3–8 || Wolf (4–10) || Hughes (13–12) || || 46,501 || 76–57 || L1
|- align="center" bgcolor="ffbbbb"
| 134 || September 3 || @ Rays || 3–4 || Shields (13–8) || Robertson (1–5) || Rodney (41) || 28,585 || 76–58 || L2
|- align="center" bgcolor="ffbbbb"
| 135 || September 4 || @ Rays || 2–5 || Cobb (9–8) || García (7–6) || Rodney (42) || 17,652 || 76–59 || L3
|- align="center" bgcolor="bbffbb"
| 136 || September 5 || @ Rays || 6–4 || Kuroda (13–10) || Moore (10–9) || Soriano (36) || 16,711 || 77–59 || W1
|- align="center" bgcolor="ffbbbb"
| 137 || September 6 || @ Orioles || 6–10 || O'Day (7–1) || Robertson (1–6) || || 46,298 || 77–60 || L1
|- align="center" bgcolor="bbffbb"
| 138 || September 7 || @ Orioles || 8–5 || Hughes (14–12) || Chen (12–9) || || 40,861 || 78–60 || W1
|- align="center" bgcolor="ffbbbb"
| 139 || September 8 || @ Orioles || 4–5 || Saunders (8–11) || Sabathia (13–5) || Johnson (42) || 46,067 || 78–61 || L1
|- align="center" bgcolor="bbffbb"
| 140 || September 9 || @ Orioles || 13–3 || Chamberlain (1–0) || Britton (5–2) || || 40,346 || 79–61 || W1
|- align="center" bgcolor="ffbbbb"
| 141 || September 11 || @ Red Sox || 3–4 || Bailey (1–0) || Robertson (1–7) || || 37,437 || 79–62 || L1
|- align="center" bgcolor="bbffbb"
| 142 || September 12 || @ Red Sox || 5–4 || Phelps (4–4) || Cook (3–10) || Soriano (37) || 37,230 || 80–62 || W1
|- align="center" bgcolor="bbffbb"
| 143 || September 13 || @ Red Sox || 2–0 || Hughes (15–12) || Doubront (10–9) || Soriano (38) || 38,134 || 81–62 || W2
|- align="center" bgcolor="ffbbbb"
| 144 || September 14 || Rays || 4–6 || Price (18–5) || Sabathia (13–6) || Rodney (43) || 45,200 || 81–63 || L1
|- align="center" bgcolor="bbffbb"
| 145 || September 15 || Rays || 5–3 || Nova (12–7) || Shields (14–9) || Soriano (39) || 46,856 || 82–63 || W1
|- align="center" bgcolor="bbffbb"
| 146 || September 16 || Rays || 6–4 || Kuroda (14–10) || Moore (10–11) || Soriano (40) || 43,489 || 83–63 || W2
|-  style="text-align:center; background:#bbb;"
|  || September 18 || Blue Jays ||colspan=7| Game Postponed (rain) (rescheduled September 19)
|- align="center" bgcolor="bbffbb"
| 147 || September 19 || Blue Jays || 4–2 || Pettitte (4–3) || Álvarez (9–13) || Soriano (41) || 39,859 || 84–63 || W3
|- align="center" bgcolor="bbffbb"
| 148 || September 19 || Blue Jays || 2–1 || Eppley (1–2) || Delabar (4–3) || Soriano (42) || 39,997 || 85–63 || W4
|- align="center" bgcolor="bbffbb"
| 149 || September 20 || Blue Jays || 10–7 || Hughes (16–12) || Laffey (3–6) || Robertson (2) || 40,511 || 86–63 || W5
|- align="center" bgcolor="bbffbb"
| 150 || September 21 || Athletics || 2–1 (10) || Robertson (2–7) || Doolittle (1–1) || || 40,759 || 87–63 || W6
|- align="center" bgcolor="bbffbb"
| 151 || September 22 || Athletics || 10–9 (14) || Wade (1–1) || Ross (2–10) || || 44,026 || 88–63 || W7
|- align="center" bgcolor="ffbbbb"
| 152 || September 23 || Athletics || 4–5 || Blevins (5–1) || Kuroda (14–11) || Balfour (20) || 43,867 || 88–64 || L1
|- align="center" bgcolor="bbffbb"
| 153 || September 24 || @ Twins  || 6–3 || Pettitte (5–3) || Hendriks (1–8) || || 33,720 || 89–64 || W1
|- align="center" bgcolor="ffbbbb"
| 154 || September 25 || @ Twins  || 4–5 || Fien (2–1) || Hughes (16–13) || Perkins (15) || 33,346 || 89–65 || L1
|- align="center" bgcolor="bbffbb"
| 155 || September 26 || @ Twins  || 8–2 || Sabathia (14–6) || Duensing (4–11) || || 33,251 || 90–65 || W1
|- align="center" bgcolor="ffbbbb"
| 156 || September 27 || @ Blue Jays || 0–6 || Morrow (9–7) || Nova (12–8) || || 23,060 || 90–66 || L1
|- align="center" bgcolor="bbffbb"
| 157 || September 28 || @ Blue Jays || 11–4 || Kuroda (15–11) || Jenkins (0–3) || || 25,785 || 91–66 || W1
|- align="center" bgcolor="ffbbbb"
| 158 || September 29 || @ Blue Jays || 2–3 || Hill (1–0) || Pettitte (5–4) || Janssen (21) || 36,139 || 91–67 || L1
|- align="center" bgcolor="bbffbb"
| 159 || September 30 || @ Blue Jays || 9–6 || Logan (7–2) || Oliver (3–4) || || 31,418 || 92–67 || W1
|- align="center" bgcolor="bbffbb"
| 160 || October 1 || Red Sox || 10–2 || Sabathia (15–6) || Buchholz (11–8) || || 45,478 || 93–67 || W2
|- align="center" bgcolor="bbffbb"
| 161 || October 2 || Red Sox || 4–3 (12)|| Lowe (9–11) || Miller (3–2) || || 41,564 || 94–67 || W3
|- align="center" bgcolor="bbffbb"
| 162 || October 3 || Red Sox || 14–2 || Kuroda (16–11) || Matsuzaka (1–7) || || 47,393 || 95–67 || W4
|-

Postseason Game log

|- align="center" bgcolor="bbffbb"
| 1 || October 7 || @ Orioles || 7–2 || Sabathia (1–0) || Johnson (0–1) || || 47,841 || 1–0 || W1
|- align="center" bgcolor="ffbbbb"
| 2 || October 8 || @ Orioles || 2–3 || Chen (1–0) || Pettitte (0–1) || Johnson (1) || 48,187 || 1–1 || L1
|- align="center" bgcolor="bbffbb"
| 3 || October 10 || Orioles || 3–2 (12) || Robertson (1–0) || Matusz (0–1) || || 50,497 || 2–1 || W1
|- align="center" bgcolor="ffbbbb"
| 4 || October 11 || Orioles || 1–2 (13) || Strop (1–0) || Phelps (0−1) || Johnson (2) || 49,307 || 2–2 || L1
|- align="center" bgcolor="bbffbb"
| 5 || October 12 || Orioles || 3–1 || Sabathia (2–0) || Hammel (0–1) || || 47,081 || 3–2 || W1
|-

|- align="center" bgcolor="ffbbbb"
| 1 || October 13 ||  Tigers || 4–6 (12) || Smyly (1–0) || Phelps (0–1) || || 47,122 || 0–1 || L1
|- align="center" bgcolor="ffbbbb"
| 2 || October 14 ||  Tigers || 0–3 || Sánchez (1–0) || Kuroda (0–1) || Coke (1) || 47,082 || 0–2 || L2 
|- align="center" bgcolor="ffbbbb"
| 3 || October 16 || @ Tigers || 1–2 || Verlander (1–0) ||  Hughes (0–1) || Coke (2) || 42,970 || 0–3 || L3
|- align="center" bgcolor="bbbbbb"
|—|| October 17 || @ Tigers ||colspan=7| Game Postponed (rain) (rescheduled October 18)
|- align="center" bgcolor="ffbbbb"
| 4 || October 18 || @ Tigers || 1–8 || Scherzer (1–0) || Sabathia (0–1) ||  || 42,477 || 0–4 || L4
|-

Postseason

Division Series

The Yankees took on the Baltimore Orioles in the Division Series.

Game 1, October 7
6:07 p.m. (EDT) at Oriole Park at Camden Yards in Baltimore, Maryland (moved to 8:47 p.m. EDT due to rain delay)

The Yankees struck first in the first inning when Derek Jeter singled and Ichiro Suzuki doubled scoring Jeter for the game's first run, giving the Yankees a 1-0 lead. In the bottom of the 3rd inning Orioles outfielder Chris Davis singled, followed by a Lew Ford single, a Robert Andino sac fly, and a single by Nate McLouth gave the O's a 2-1 lead. Then in the top of the 4th the Yankees tied the game at 2 with a Mark Teixeira single with two men on. 
The game remained tied going into the ninth inning until a lead off home run by Russell Martin pushed the Yankees ahead 3-2. Singles by Raúl Ibañez, Derek Jeter, and Ichiro Suzuki all singled back-to-back-to-back scoring Ibañez giving the Yanks 4-2 lead. Canó doubled scoring Jeter and Ichiro. Nick Swisher hit a sac fly to score Cano, making the score 7-2. David Robertson came on to get the final out of the game, giving the Yankees the win and a one-game to nothing lead.

Game 2, October 8
8:07 p.m. (EDT) at Oriole Park at Camden Yards in Baltimore, Maryland (moved to 8:47 p.m. EDT due to rain delay)

Game 3, October 10
7:37 p.m. (EDT) at Yankee Stadium in Bronx, New York

Baltimore got on the board first with a Ryan Flaherty solo home run in the top of the third inning, giving the Orioles a 1–0 lead. In the bottom half of the inning, the Yankees got on the board with Russell Martin double followed by a Derek Jeter triple tying the game at 1. The game remained tied until the top of the fifth inning when a Manny Machado solo home run gave the Orioles a 2–1 lead. The score remained the same until the bottom of the ninth inning, when Yankees manager Joe Girardi pinch hit Raúl Ibañez for Alex Rodriguez. On the second pitch of the at bat, Ibañez crushed a home run into the right field bleachers to tie the game at 2. The score remained 2–2 going into the bottom of the 12th inning, until Ibañez came up to bat again crushing a walk-off home run into the upper deck in right field, giving the Yankees a 3–2 victory and a 2–1 lead in the series. Raúl Ibañez became the first player in Major League history to homer twice in a postseason game that he did not start.

Game 4, October 11 
7:37 p.m. (EDT) at Yankee Stadium in Bronx, New York

Game 5, October 12 
5:07 p.m. (EDT) at Yankee Stadium in Bronx, New York

The Yankees clinched a trip to the ALCS for the third time in four years with a 3–1 win. CC Sabathia gave the Yankees his second big performance of the series, pitching a complete game, giving up one run on four hits while striking out nine. The only nervous moments came in the sixth, when a long fly ball by Nate McLouth just barely went foul and the eighth, when the Orioles loaded the bases with one out, but Sabathia got out of the jam by striking out McLouth and getting J. J. Hardy to ground out.

The Yankees scored first in the fifth, when Game 3 hero Raúl Ibañez singled to score Mark Teixeira. The Yankees tacked on some insurance in the sixth on an Ichiro Suzuki double and a Curtis Granderson home run in the seventh. It proved enough, as CC got Matt Wieters to ground out for the final out, sending the Yankees to a chance to play for the pennant versus the Detroit Tigers.

American League Championship Series

The Yankees were defeated by the Detroit Tigers in the Championship Series.

Game 1
Saturday, October 13, 2012 – 8:07 p.m. (EDT) at Yankee Stadium in Bronx, New York

The Yankees managed to come back from a 4-0 deficit in the 9th inning to tie it. The rally culminated with a Raul Ibanez 2-run home run. However, the rally would stall there. Then, during extra innings, Yankees shortstop Derek Jeter broke his left ankle while diving for a groundball in the 12th inning. The Yankees were already down 5-4 at that point, and the Yankees would later lose the game. The injury would haunt the Yankees for the rest of the series.

Game 2
Sunday, October 14, 2012 – 4:07 p.m. (EDT) at Yankee Stadium in Bronx, New York

Game 3
Tuesday, October 16, 2012 – 8:07 p.m. (EDT) at Comerica Park in Detroit, Michigan

Game 4
Thursday, October 18, 2012 – 4:07 p.m. (EDT) at Comerica Park in Detroit, Michigan, originally scheduled for Wednesday, October 17, 2012 – 8:07 p.m. (EDT) and was postponed due to rain

Farm system

References

External links

2012 New York Yankees season
2012 New York Yankees season at Baseball Reference

New York Yankees seasons
New York Yankees
New York Yankees
2010s in the Bronx
American League East champion seasons